Toudja is a town situated to the west of the Algerian city of Béjaïa, in the mountains to the north of the main road from Béjaïa to Tizi Ouzou. The liberal pied noir writer Jules Roy discussed it in his book on the Algerian war of independence.

Oranges are grown widely in the area. In Roman times its springs were an important source of water and there was an aqueduct taking water to the city of  Saldae (now Béjaïa).

References 

Communes of Béjaïa Province